"Cadillac Tears" is a song recorded by American country music artist Kevin Denney.  It was released in June 2002 as the second single from the album Kevin Denney.  The song reached #30 on the Billboard Hot Country Singles & Tracks chart.  The song was written by Leslie Satcher and Wynn Varble.

Content
The song is about a divorcee who extravagantly spends the money that she has received in her settlement, such as a new Cadillac automobile.

Chart performance

References

2002 singles
2002 songs
Kevin Denney songs
Lyric Street Records singles
Songs written by Leslie Satcher
Songs written by Wynn Varble
Songs about cars